Stuart Blumberg (born July 19, 1969) is an American screenwriter, actor, producer and director.

Early life 
Blumberg grew up in Shaker Heights, Ohio and graduated from University School. He is of Jewish descent. He graduated from Yale University in 1991 with a BA in History, where Edward Norton was a roommate.

Career 
Blumberg was nominated for an Oscar for Best Original Screenplay in 2010 for co-writing The Kids Are All Right.

Blumberg made his directorial debut with the Hollywood film Thanks for Sharing starring Mark Ruffalo, Tim Robbins, Gwyneth Paltrow, Josh Gad, Joely Richardson, and Alecia Moore. The film is about sex addiction and how a group of New Yorkers deal with recovery.

Filmography

As director 
 Thanks for Sharing (2012)
 She Said, She Said (short, 2013)
 The Testament (TBA)

As writer 
 MADtv (TV series, 1996)
 Keeping the Faith (2000)
 The Girl Next Door (2004)
 The Kids Are All Right (2010)
 Thanks for Sharing (2012)

References

External links 
 

1969 births
Living people
American male screenwriters
American television writers
Jewish American writers
Yale College alumni
Film directors from Ohio
Writers from Shaker Heights, Ohio
American male television writers
Actors from Shaker Heights, Ohio
Screenwriters from Ohio
21st-century American Jews